Saint Sacerdos (Sacerdos de Calviac, Sardot, Sadroc, Sardou, Serdon, Serdot) of Limoges (670—c. 720) is a French saint.  He was born near Sarlat and became a monk.  He was the founder and abbot of Calviac Abbey. He was later appointed bishop of Limoges and then of Sigüenza.

His mother was Saint Modane.

Sarlat Cathedral is dedicated to him.

References

External links
Saints of May 4: Sacerdos of Limoges

8th-century Frankish bishops
Bishops of Limoges
8th-century Frankish saints